"What You Deserve" is a song by American metal band Ill Niño. The song was released as a single from the band's third studio album One Nation Underground. The song features a heavy use of electronics from keyboardist Omar Clavijo.

Track listing

Charts

References

2005 songs
2005 singles
Ill Niño songs
Roadrunner Records singles
Songs written by Cristian Machado
Music videos directed by Dale Resteghini